Frank Cóndor-Fernández (born 10 January 1984) is a Spanish former professional tennis player.

A native of Málaga, Cóndor had a best singles ranking of 325 in the world and won three ITF Futures titles during his career. He made his only ATP Tour main draw appearance as a qualifier at the 2005 Estoril Open.

ITF Futures titles

Singles: (3)

References

External links
 
 

1984 births
Living people
Spanish male tennis players
Tennis players from Andalusia
Sportspeople from Málaga